Agund (also Romanized as Āgūnd; also known as Āgond) is a village in Kahir Rural District, in the Central District of Konarak County, Sistan and Baluchestan Province, Iran. At the 2006 census, its population was 75, in 18 families.

References 

Populated places in Konarak County